The 2018 Big Sky Conference women's soccer tournament was the postseason women's soccer tournament for the Big Sky Conference held from October  31 to November 4, 2018. The five-match tournament took place at Wildcat Soccer Field, home of the regular-season champions Weber State Wildcats. The six-team single-elimination tournament consisted of three rounds based on seeding from regular season conference play. The Eastern Washington Eagles were the defending champions and did not successfully defended their title, losing to the Northern Colorado Bears in the quarterfinals.  The fifth seeded Montana Grizzlies upset three teams along their way to a championship, beating Northern Colorado 1–0 in the final.

Bracket

Source:

Schedule

First Round

Semifinals

Final

Statistics

Goalscorers 
2 Goals
 Taylor Bray - Northern Colorado
 Alexa Coyle - Montana
 Janessa Fowler - Montana
 Mariel Gutierrez - Northern Colorado

1 Goal
 Jenny Chavez - Eastern Washington
 Maddie Roberts - Northern Colorado
 Cara Quinn - Northern Colorado

All Tournament Team

References

External links 
2018 Big Sky Conference Women's Soccer Championship

Big Sky Conference Women's Soccer Tournament
2018 Big Sky Conference women's soccer season